The Fugitive of Joseon (lit. "Heaven's Order: The Story of the Fugitive from Joseon") is a 2013 South Korean historical television series starring Lee Dong-wook and Song Ji-hyo. It aired on KBS2 from April 24 to June 27, 2013 on Wednesdays and Thursdays at 21:55 for 20 episodes.

Plot
Set during the reign of King Injong, the protagonist is a royal physician desperate to cure his ailing daughter. He becomes a fugitive when he gets entangled in an assassination plot to poison the crown prince, and fights to save both his daughter's life and his own.

Cast

Main characters
Lee Dong-wook as Choi Won 
A royal physician and doting father turned fugitive who is out to clear his name and save his daughter.

Song Ji-hyo as Hong Da-in
A royal nurse and Choi Won's assistant. She has a proud personality.

Kim Yoo-bin as Choi Rang 
Choi Won's daughter.

Lim Seul-ong as Crown Prince Lee Ho
The son of King Jungjong, he lives day by day amid an uneasy life.

Yoon Jin-yi as So Baek 
Cheerful and tomboyish, she is the daughter of a bandit who ends up on the run with Choi Won.

Park Ji-young as Queen Moon-jung
Song Jong-ho as Lee Jung-hwan
As part of the uigeumbu (Joseon-era government bureau that investigated serious crimes), he is the best detective around and skilled with the sword.

Kang Byul as Choi Woo-young
Choi Won's sister.
Kwon Hyun-sang as Im Kkuk-jung

Supporting characters
Jeon Guk-hwan as Minister Kim Chi-yong
Lee Hee-do as Merchant Jang Hong-dal
Sung Woong as Do-moon
Seo Dong-hyun as Grand Prince Gyeongwon
Choi Il-hwa as King Jungjong
Kim Jung-kyun as Yun Won-hyung
Kim Yoon-sung as Gon-oh
Choi Phillip as Min Do-saeng
Kim Mi-kyung as Jang-geum
Lee Jae-yong as Chun-bong
Lee Won-jong as Geo-chil
Park Sun-woo as Gae Pal-son
Jo Dal-hwan as Deok-pal
Yoon Gi-won as Mak-bong
Kim Hyung-beom as Pil-doo
Jung Yoon-seon as Wol-ha
Jang Yong-bok as Choi Chang-son
Go In-beom as Choi Hyung-goo
Yoo Chae-yeong as Geum-ok
Yeom Dong-heon as common official naesi
Kim Dong-jun as Mu Myeong

Ratings

International broadcast
It aired in Japan on cable channel DATV.
It aired in Thailand on PPTV beginning January 5, 2015.
It aired in Iran on iribtv3HD beginning September 3, 2016.

Awards and nominations

References

External links
  
 
 
 

2013 South Korean television series debuts
2013 South Korean television series endings
Korean Broadcasting System television dramas
Korean-language television shows
South Korean historical television series
South Korean action television series
Television series set in the Joseon dynasty
Television series by Celltrion Entertainment